Many countries around the world maintain military units that are specifically trained to operate in a cyberwarfare environment. In several cases this units acts also as the national computer emergency response team for civilian cybersecurity threats.

Albania
 Military Cyber Security Unit (Një e Sigurisë Kibernetike)

Argentina
 Joint Cyber Defense Command of the Armed Forces Joint Staff (Comando Conjunto de Ciberdefensa del Estado Mayor Conjunto de las Fuerzas Armadas)
 Cyberdefense Operations Center (Centro de Operaciones de Ciberdefensa)
 Cyberdefense Engineering Center (Centro de Ingenieria de Ciberdefensa)
 Security Operations Intelligent Center (Centro Inteligente de Operaciones de Seguridad)
 National Cyberdefense Center (Centro Nacional de Ciberdefensa)
 Informatic Energencies Response Center of the Defense Ministry (Centro de Respuesta ante Emergencias Informáticas del Minisetrio de Defensa)
 Cybernetic Analysis Laboratory (Laboratorio de Análisis Cibernéticos)

Armenia
 Subdivision 1991 (1991 Ստորաբաժանում - 1991 Storabazhanum)

Australia
 Information Warfare Division
 Defence Signals Intelligence and Cyber Command
 Joint Cyber Unit
Army
 138th Signal Squadron
Navy
 Fleet Cyber Unit
Air Force
 No. 462 Information Warfare Squadron

Austria
 Information Communications Technologies and Cybersecurity Center (Informations-Kommunikations-Technologie und Cybersicherheitszentrum)

Azerbaijan
 Special State Protection Service - State Agency for Special Communications and Information Security (Xüsusi Dövlət Mühafizə - Xidməti Xüsusi Rabitə və İnformasiya Təhlükəsizliyi Dövlət Agentliyi)

Belarus
 Information Technology Specialized Company (Специализированную роту по информационной безопасности - Spetsializirovannuyu Rotu po Informatsionnoy Bezopasnosti)

Belgium
 Defense Cyber Directorate
 Cyber Command

Bolivia
 Cybersecurity and Cyberdefense Center (Centro de Ciberseguridad y Ciberdefensa)

Brazil
Cybernetic Defense Command (Comando de Defesa Cibernética)
National Cybernetic Defense School (Escola Nacional de Defesa Cibernética)
Cybernetic Defense Center (Centro de Defesa Cibernética)

Brunei
Air Force
 Cyber Defence Unit

Bulgaria
 Stationary Communication Information System (Стационарна Комуникационна Информационна Система - Statsionarna Komunikatsionna Informatsionna Sistema)

Canada
 Canadian Forces Network Operation Centre
 Army Reserve
 Cyber Group, 32 Signal Regiment
 Cyber Group, 34 Signal Regiment

Chile
 Cyberdefense Incidents Response Center (Centro de Respuesta a Incidencias de Ciberdefensa)

China
 People's Liberation Army Strategic Support Force (人民解放军战略支援部队 - Rénmín Jiěfàngjūn Zhànlüè Zhīyuán Bùduì)
People's Liberation Army Network System Department (人民解放军网络系统部 - Rénmín Jiěfàngjūn Wǎngluò Xìtǒng Bù)
 Unit 61489 (61489部队 - 61489 Bùduì)
 Unit 61786 (61786部队 - 61786 Bùduì)
 56th Jiangan Computing Technologies Research Institute (第56江南计算技术研究所 - Dì 56 Jiāngnán Jìsuàn Jìshù Yánjiū Suǒ)
 57th Research Institute (第57研究所 - Dì 57 Yánjiū Suǒ)
 58th Research Institute (第58研究所 - Dì 58 Yánjiū Suǒ)
 Cyberspace Security Academy (网络空间安全学院 - Wǎngluò Kōngjiān Ānquán Xuéyuàn)

Colombia
 Joint Cybernetic Command (Comando Conjunto Cibernetico)
 National Army Cybernetic Unit (Unidad Cibernética Ejército Nacional)
National Navy Cibernetic Unit (Unidad Cibernética Armada Nacional)
Air Force Cybernetic Unit (Unidad Cibernética Fuerza Aérea)
Communications and Cyberdefense Operational Support Command (Comando de Apoyo Operacional de Comunicaciones y Ciberdefensa)

Croatia
 Cybernetic Domain Command of the General Staff (Zapovjedništvo za Kibernetički Prostor Generalštaba)

Cuba
 Military Cyberdefense Command (Mando Militar de Ciberdefensa)

Cyprus
 Cyber Defense Command of the General Staff of National Defense (Διοίκηση Κυβερνοάμυνας του Γενικού Επιτελείου Εθνικής Άμυνας - Dioíkisi Kyvernoámynas tou Genikoú Epiteleíou Ethnikís Ámynas)

Czech Republic
National Cyber Operations Centre (Národní Centrum Kybernetických Operací)

Denmark
 Cyber Security Center (Center for Cybersikkerhed)

Dominican Republic
 Armed Forces Command, Control, Communications, Computers, Cybersecurity and Intelligence Center (Centro de Comando, Control, Comunicaciones, Computadoras, Ciberseguridad e Inteligencia de las Fuerzas Armadas)

Ecuador
 Cyberdefense Command (Comando de Ciberdefensa)

Estonia
 Cyber Command (Küberväejuhatus)
 Defence League Cyberdefense Unit (Kaitseliidu Küberkaitse Űksus)

Finland
 Defense Forces Command System Center (Puolustusvoimien Johtamisjärjestelmäkeskus)

France
Inter-service
 Cyberdefence Command (Commandement de la Cyberdéfense)
 Armed Forces Cyberdefence Group (Groupement de la Cyberdéfense des Armées)
 Information Systems Security Audit Center (Centre d’Audits de la Sécurité des Systèmes d’Information)
 Defensive Computer Fighting Analysis Center (Centre d’Analyse en Lutte Informatique Défensive)
 Cyberdefense Reserve and Operational Readiness Center (Centre de la Réserve et de la Préparation Opérationnelle de Cyberdéfense)
 Main Inter-services Standardization Center(Centre d’Homologation Principale Interarmées)
Army
Operational Center for Land Information and Communication Systems and Cybersecurity Networks (Centre Opérationnel des Réseaux SIC (Systèmes d’Information et de Communication) Terre et de Cybersécurité)
 807th Signal Company ( 807e Compagnie de Transmission)
Navy
 Cyber Defense Support Center (Centre Support de Cyber-Défense)
 Cyber Defense Platoon, Commando Kieffer (Section de Cyberdéfense, Commando Kieffer)
Air Force
 Aerospace Environment Cyberdefence Center of Excellence (Centre d’Excellence en Cyberdéfense du Milieu Aérospatial)

Georgia
 Cyber Security Bureau

Germany
Cyber and Information Domain Command (Kommando Cyber- und Informationsraum)
 Armed Forces Information Technology Command (Kommando Informationstechnik der Bundeswehr)
 Armed Forces Cyber Security Center (Zentrum für Cyber-Sicherheit der Bundeswehr)
 Strategic Reconnaissance Command (Kommando Strategische Aufklärung)
 Cyber Operations Center (Zentrum Cyber-Operationen)

Greece
 Cyber Defense Directorate of the General Staff of National Defense (Διεύθυνση Κυβερνοάμυνας του Γενικού Επιτελείου Εθνικής Άμυνας - Diéfthynsi Kyvernoámynas tou Genikoú Epiteleíou Ethnikís Ámynas)

Guatemala
 Computing and Technology Command (Comando de Informática y Tecnología)

Hungary
 Cyber Defense Center - Military National Security Service (Kibervédelmi Központ - Katonai Nemzetbiztonsági Szolgálat)

India
Defence Cyber Agency (रक्षा साइबर एजेंसी - Raksha Saibar Ejensee)

Indonesia
 Indonesian National Armed Forces Cyber Unit (Satuan Siber Tentara Nasional Indonesia)
 Indonesian Air Force Cyber Unit (Satuan Siber Tentara Nasional Indonesia-Angkatan Udara)

Iran
Cyber Defense Command (قرارگاه دفاع سایبری; - Gharargah-e Defa-e Saiberi)

Ireland
 Communications and Information Services Corps (An Cór Seirbhísí Cumarsáide agus Eolais)

Israel
Inter-services
 C4I and Cyber Defense Directorate
Unit 8200 (יחידה 8200 - Yehida Shmonae Matayim)
 Air Force
 Unit "Horizon 324" (יחידת "אופק 324 - Yehidat "Ofek 324" )

Italy
Inter-service
 Network Operations Command (Comando per le Operazioni in Rete)
 Security and Cyber Defence Unit (Reparto Sicurezza e Cyber Defence)
 Cyber Operations Unit (Reparto Cyber Operations)
Army
 Cybernetic Security Unit (Reparto Sicurezza Cibernetica)
 Computer Incident Response Team - 3rd Signal Regiment (Nucleo CIRT - 3° Reggimento Trasmissioni)
 Computer Incident Response Team - 32nd Signal Regiment (Nucleo CIRT - 32° Reggimento Trasmissioni)
 Computer Incident Response Team - 46th Signal Regiment (Nucleo CIRT - 46° Reggimento Trasmissioni)
Navy
 Cybernetic, Informatic and Signal Security Office (Ufficio Sicurezza Cibernetica, Informatica e delle Comunicazioni)
Air Force
 Automated Information Systems Unit (Reparto Sistemi Informativi Automatizzati)

Japan
 Japan Air Self-Defense Force ( - )
 Self Defence Force Command and Communication System Department ( - )
Cyber Defense Team ( - )
 Network Operations Team ( - )

Jordan
 Armed Forces Computer Emergency Response Team

Latvia
National Guard Cyberdefense Unit (Zemessardzes Kiberaizsardzības Vienība)

Lithuania
Army Cyber Incidents Rapid Response Command (Kariuomenės Greitojo Reagavimo Į Kibernetinius Incidentus Komanda)

Malaysia
 Cyber and Electromagnetic Command (Pemerintahan Siber dan Elektromagnetik)

Mexico
Inter-service
 Cyberspace Operations Center (Centro de Operaciones del Ciberespacio)
Navy
 Cybersecurity Unit (Unidad de Ciberseguridad)

Moldova
 Armed Forces Cybernetic Incidents Reaction Center (Centru de Reacție la Incidente Cibernetice a Forțelor Armate)

Morocco
 Royal Armed Forces Cyber Center of Excellence

NATO
Cyber Operations Centre
NATO Cyber Range
Cooperative Cyber Defence Centre of Excellence
European Centre of Excellence for Countering Hybrid Threats

Netherlands
Defense Cyber Command (Defensie Cyber Commando)
Defense Computer Emergency Response Team
Joint Signal Intelligence (SIGINT) Cyber Unit

New Zealand
 Cyber Cell, 1st Command Support Regiment

Nigeria
 Cyber Warfare Command

North Korea
Research Institute 110 (110호 연구소 - 110ho Yeonguso)
31st Technical Reconnaissance Office (기술정찰조 31소 - Gisuljeongchaljo 31so)
32nd Technical Reconnaissance Office (기술정찰조 32소 - Gisuljeongchaljo 32so)
56th Technical Reconnaissance Office (기술정찰조 56소 - Gisuljeongchaljo 56so)

General Staff Department of the Korean People's Army:

 Operation Bureau
 Communications Bureau
 Electronic Warfare Bureau
 Enemy Collapse Sabotage Bureau:
 Unit 204
 Command Automation Bureau/Department:
 (General Staff's) Office 31/unit (develops hacking tools)
 (General Staff's) Office/unit 32 (develops military-related software)
 (General Staff's) Office/unit 56 (develops software for command and control)

Reconnaissance General Bureau:
 Bureau 325 (stealing information on vaccine technology related to COVID-19)
 Bureau 121 (network attacks and exfiltration operations)
 Lab 110 (Technology Reconnaissance Team)
 Office 98
 Office 414
 Office 35
 Office/Unit 91:
 Unit 110 (AKA Technology Reconnaissance Team)
 Unit 35 (Central Party's Investigations Department)
 Unit 121 (NKPA Joint Chiefs Cyber Warfare Unit 121)
 Unit 204 (Cyber PSYOPS)
 Unit 180
 128 Liaison Office
 413 Liaison Office
 The Andariel Group
 The Bluenoroff Group
 an Electronic Warfare Jamming Regiment
 Lazarus Group
 Computer Technology Research Lab
6th Technical Bureau of the Reconnaissance General Bureau
 Bureau/Lab 110 / 110 Institute (Technology Reconnaissance Team, conducts computer network operations against military units and strategic organizations.)
 3rd Bureau of the RGB (AKA 3rd Technical Surveillance Bureau, responsible for North Korea's cyber operations)
 110th Research Center
 Lazarus Group
 Bluenoroff (earn revenue illicitly in response to increased global sanctions...)
 Andariel (See source for details)

Others:

 The Data Investigation Examination Office (conducts cyber espionage to collect intelligence on politics, economics, and societies abroad)
 KWP's Unification and United Front Department (cyber influence operations through social media and websites such as Uriminzokkiri, which is maintained by the party's Committee for the Peaceful Reunification of the Fatherland.)
 The KWP Central Party Investigative Group
 Unit 35 (education and training).
 The State Security Department's (secret police) communications monitoring and computer hacking group conducts cyber warfare, presumably in support of its mission of internal state security.

Norway
 Cyber Defence Force (Cyberforsvarets)
Cyber Defense Computer Information Services (CIS) Regiment (Cyberforsvarets CIS-regiment) 
Cyber Security Center (Cybersikkerhetssenteret) 
Cyber Defense Weapons School (Cyberforsvarets Våpenskole) 
Cyber Defense Information and Communication Technologies (ICT) Service (Cyberforsvarets IKT-tjenester) 
Cyber Defense Base and Alarm Service (Cyberforsvarets Base- og Alarmtjenester)

Paraguay
 General Directorate of Information and Communication Technologies of the Armed Forces (Dirección General de Tecnologías de la Información y Comunicación de las Fuerzas Armadas)

Peru
Cyberdefense Operational Command (Comando Operacional de Ciberdefensa)

Philippines
Army Cyber Defense Team

Poland
Cybernetic Operations Center (Centrum Operacji Cybernetycznych)
 National Center for Cyberspace Security (Narodowe Centrum Bezpieczeństwa Cyberprzestrzeni)
 Defense Ministry Coordination Center for Computer Incident Response - Military Counterintelligence Service (Centrum Koordynacyjnego Systemu Reagowania na Incydenty Komputerowe Obrony Narodowej - Służba Kontrwywiadu Wojskowego)
 Cyberspace Defense Forces (Wojska Obrony Cyberprzestrzeni)

Portugal
 Cyberdefense Center - Armed Forces General Staff (Centro de Ciberdefesa – Estado Maior General das Forças Armadas)
 Computer Incident Response Capability - Army (CIRC Exercito)
 Computer Incident Response Capability - Navy (CIRC Marinha)
 Computer Incident Response Capability - Air Force (CIRC Força Aerea)

Romania
Cybernetic Defense Command (Comandamentul Apărării Cibernetice)
 Informatic Technology Agency (Agenţia de Tehnologia Informaţiei)
 Cybernetic Defense Agency (Agenţia de Apărăre Cibernetică)

Russian Federation
 Information Operations Troops (Войска информационных операций - Voyska Informatsionnykh Operatsiy)
Western Military District Cybersecurity Center (Западный военный округ центр киберзащиты – Zapadnyy Voyenny Okrug Tsentr Kiberzashchity)
Southern Military District Cybersecurity Center (Южный военный округ центр киберзащиты – Yuzhnyy Voyenny Okrug Tsentr Kiberzashchity)
Central Military District Cybersecurity Center (Центральный военный округ центр киберзащиты – Tsentral'nyy Voyenny Okrug Tsentr Kiberzashchity)
Eastern Military District Cybersecurity Center (Восточный военный округ центр киберзащиты – Vostochnyy Voyenny Okrug Tsentr Kiberzashchity)
Joint Strategic Command “Northern Fleet” Cybersecurity Center (Объединённое стратегическое командование “Северный флот” центр киберзащиты - Ob"yedinonnoye Strategicheskoye Komandovaniye “Severnyy flot” Tsentr Kiberzashchity)
 Special Development Center of the Ministry of Defense (Центр специальных разработок Министерства обороны - Tsentr Spetsial'nykh Razrabotok Ministerstva Oborony)
6th Directorate - General Directorate of the General Staff (Шестое Управление-Главное управление Генерального штаба - Shestoye Upravleniye-Glavnoye Upravleniye General'nogo Shtaba)
85th Special Service Main Center – Military Unit 26165 (85-й главный центр специальной службы-Военная часть 26165 - 85-y Glavnyy Tsentr Spetsial'noy Sluzhby-Voyennaya Chast' 26165)) 
Special Technologies Main Center – Military Unit 74455 (Главный центр специальных технологий-Военная часть 74455 - Glavnyy Tsentr Spetsial'nykh Tekhnologiy-Voyennaya Chast' 74455)

Serbia
 224th Center for Electronic Action (224. Центар за електронска дејства - 224. Centar za Elektronska Dejstva)

Singapore
 Defence Cyber Organisation
Cyber Defence School
Cyber Defence Group
Digital and Intelligence Service

Slovakia
 Military Intelligence Cybernetic Defense Center (Centrum pre Kybernetickú Obranu - Vojenského Spravodajstva )

South Africa
 Directorate Information Warfare

Slovenia
 Communication and Information Systems Unit (Enota za Komunikacijske in Informacijske Sisteme)
 Cyber Defence Centre (Center za Kibernetsko Obrambo)
 Threat Research Centre (Center za Raziskovanje Groženj)

South Korea
Cyber Operations Command (사이버 작전 사령부 - Saibeo Jagjeon Salyeongbu)
500th Center (Cyber Defense Operations Office) (500센터(사이버방어작전 담당) – 500 Senteo Saibeobang-Eojagjeon Damdang)) 
700th Center (Cyber Threats Information Management Office) (700센터(사이버위협정보 담당) – 700 Senteo (Saibeo Wihyeob Jeongbo Damdang))

Spain
Inter-service
Joint Cyberspace Command (Mando Conjunto del Ciberespacio)
 Cyberspace Operations Force (Fuerza de Operaciones en el Ciberespacio)
 Cyberdefense Systems Command (Jefatura de Sistemas de Ciberdefensa)
 Army
 32nd Electronic Warfare Regiment (Regimiento de Guerra Electrónica nº 32)
Navy
 Cyberdefense Section (Sección de Ciberdefensa)
Air Force
 Cyberdefense Security Operations Center (Centro de Operaciones de Seguridad de Ciberdefensa)

Sri Lanka
 Ministry of Defence Cyber Operations Centre (MoD COC) - SLAF Colombo
 12th Regiment (Cyber Security), Sri Lanka Signal Corps

Sweden
 Information TechnologiesDefense Forces (Informationsteknikförsvarsförbandet)
 Information Systems Defense Force (Informationssystemförband)

Switzerland
 Command Support Base (Führungsunterstützungsbasis - Base d'Aide au Commandement - Base d'Aiuto alla Condotta)
 Cyber Security Division
 Cyber Fusion Center
 Cyber Battalion 42

Taiwan
Information Communication and Electronic Warfare Command (信息和电子战司令部 - Xìnxī Hé Diànzǐ Zhàn Sīlìng Bù)

Thailand
 Army Cyber Center (ศูนย์ไซเบอร์กองทัพบก - Ṣ̄ūny̒ Sịbexr̒ Kxngthạph Bk)

Turkey
 Cyber Defence Command (Siber Savunma Komutanlığı)
 Cyber Defence Center (Siber Savunma Merkezi)

Ukraine
Command of the Communications and Cyber Security Troops of the Armed Forces of Ukraine (Командування військ зв’язку та кібернетичної безпеки Збройних Сил України - Komanduvannya vijsk zvyazku ta kibernetychnoyi bezpeky Zbroynykh Syl Ukrayiny)

United Kingdom
Army
13th Signal Regiment
 224 (Defensive Cyber Operations) Signal Squadron
 233 (Global Communication Networks) Signal Squadron
 259 (Global Information Services) Signal Squadron
Navy
Cyber Defence Operations Center
Air Force
 Air Cyber and Information Services Operations Centre
 No. 5 (Information Services) Squadron
 591 Defensive Cyber Air Combat Service Support Unit
Inter-service
Joint Forces Cyber Group
Joint Cyber Unit (Cheltenham)
Joint Cyber Unit (Corsham)
Cyber Information Systems Operations Centre
Cyber Security Operations Centre
 Defense Cyber School
Joint Cyber Unit (Reserve)
Army Reserve
Land Information Assurance Group (Reserve)
254th Specialist Group Information Services (SIGIS) Signal Squadron, 15th Signals Regiment (Reserve)
Navy Reserve
Reserve Cyber Unit
Royal Auxiliary Air Force
 Cyberspace Communications Specialists Section, No. 600 (City of London) Squadron (Royal Auxiliary Air Force)
 Cyberspace Communications Specialists Section, No. 614 (County of Glamorgan) Squadron (Royal Auxiliary Air Force)

United States
Inter-service
 United States Cyber Command
 Joint Task Force ARES
Army
 U.S. Army Cyber Command
 U.S. Army Network Enterprise Technology Command
 1st Information Operations Command (Land)
 1st Information Operations Battalion
 2nd Information Operations Battalion
 780th Military Intelligence Brigade (Cyber) “Pretorians”
 781st Military Intelligence Battalion “Vanguard”
 782nd Military Intelligence Battalion “Cyber Legion” 
 915th Cyber Warfare Battalion
 Cyber Solutions Development Detachment
 Task Force Echo (Army Reserve) 
 U.S. Army Cyber Center of Excellence
 U.S. Army Cyber School
 U.S. Army Cyber Technical College
 U.S. Army Cyber Leader College
 Cyber Training Battalion - 15th Signal Brigade
 Multi-Domain Task Force 1
 Multi-Domain Effects Battalion (previously Intelligence, Information, Cyber, Electronic Warfare and Space Battalion)
 Information Defense Company
 Army Reserve
 Cyber Protection Brigade
 North East Cyber Protection Center
 Cyber Protection Team 180
 Cyber Protection Team 181
 National Capital Region Cyber Protection Center
 Cyber Protection Team 182
 Cyber Protection Team 183
 South West Cyber Protection Center
 Cyber Protection Team 184
 Cyber Protection Team 185
 North Central Cyber Protection Center
 Cyber Protection Team 186
 Cyber Protection Team 187
 Western Cyber Protection Center
 Cyber Protection Team 188
 Cyber Protection Team 189
 Arizona Cyber Warfare Range
Army National Guard
91st Cyber Brigade (Virginia NG)
123rd Cyber Protection Battalion (Virginia NG)
124th Cyber Protection Battalion (Virginia NG)
125th Cyber Protection Battalion (South Carolina NG)
126th Cyber Protection Battalion (Massachusetts NG)
127th Cyber Protection Battalion (Indiana NG)
Cyber Protection Team 169 (Maryland NG)
Cyber Protection Team 170 (Georgia NG)
Cyber Protection Team 171 (California NG)
Cyber Protection Team 172 (Michigan NG)
Cyber Protection Team 173 (New York NG)
Cyber Protection Team 174 (Colorado and Utah NG)
Cyber Protection Team 175 (Alabama, Kentucky and Tennessee NG)
Cyber Protection Team 176 (Illinois and Wisconsin NG)
Cyber Protection Team 177 (Minnesota NG)
Cyber Protection Team 178 (Mississippi NG)
Cyber Protection Team 179 (Nebraska NG)
Defensive Cyber Operations Element (Colorado NG)
Defensive Cyber Operations Element (Florida NG)
 Defensive Cyber Operations Element (Oklahoma NG)
 Defensive Cyber Operations Element (Pennsylvania NG)
Defensive Cyber Operations Element (West Virginia NG)
 Cyber Mission Assurance Team (Ohio NG)
 Cyber Mission Assurance Team (Hawaii NG)
 Cyber Mission Assurance Team (Washington NG)
Navy
U.S. Fleet Cyber Command – Tenth Fleet
Naval Network Warfare Command (Task Force 1010)
Navy Cyber Defense Operations Command (Task Force 1020)
Air Force
  Sixteenth Air Force (Air Force Cyber)
 Cyberspace Capabilities Center
 Air Force Cyber College
 67th Cyberspace Wing
 67th Operations Support Squadron (ACC)
 67th Cyberspace Operations Group
 91st Cyberspace Operations Squadron
 305th Cyberspace Operations Squadron
 352nd Cyberspace Operations Squadron
 390th Cyberspace Operations Squadron
 375th Cyberspace Operations Squadron
318th Cyberspace Operations Group
 39th Information Operations Squadron
 90th Cyberspace Operations Squadron ”Shadow Warriors”
 318th Range Squadron
 346th Test Squadron
 567th Cyberspace Operations Group
 92nd Cyberspace Operations Squadron
 834th Cyberspace Operations Squadron
 835th Cyberspace Operations Squadron
 837th Cyberspace Operations Squadron
 867th Cyberspace Operations Group
 315th Cyberspace Operations Squadron
 341st Cyberspace Operations Squadron
 833rd Cyberspace Operations Squadron
 836th Cyberspace Operations Squadron
688th Cyberspace Wing
688th Operations Support Squadron
26th Cyberspace Operations Group
 26th Network Operations Squadron
 33rd Network Warfare Squadron
 68th Network Warfare Squadron
690th Cyberspace Operations Group
 83rd Network Operations Squadron
 561st Network Operations Squadron
 690th Cyberspace Operations Squadron
 690th Intelligence Support Squadron
 690th Network Support Squadron
 691st Cyberspace Operations Squadron
 Air Force Materiel Command
96th Cyberspace Test Group
 47th Cyberspace Test Squadron
 Air Force Institute of Technology
 Air Force Cyberspace Technical Center of Excellence
 Center for Cyberspace Research
Air Force Reserve
960th Cyberspace Wing
 860th Cyberspace Operations Group
 51st Network Operations Squadron
 53rd Network Operations Squadron
 710th Network Operations Squadron
 717th Information Operations Squadron
960th Cyberspace Operations Group
 42nd Cyberspace Operations Squadron
 50th Network Warfare Squadron
 52nd Network Warfare Squadron
 426th Network Warfare Squadron “Guardians of the Grid”
 689th Network Operations Squadron
Air National Guard
 175th Cyberspace Operations Group (Maryland ANG)
 275th Cyberspace Operations Squadron (Maryland ANG)
 276th Cyberspace Operations Squadron (Maryland ANG)
 184th Cyberspace Operations Group (Kansas ANG) 
 127th Cyberspace Operations Squadron (Kansas ANG)
 177th Information Warfare Aggressor Squadron “Jayhawkers” (Kansas ANG)
 299th Network Operations Security Squadron (Kansas ANG)
 252d Cyberspace Operations Group (Washington ANG)
 143rd Information Operations Squadron (Washington ANG)
 262nd Cyberspace Operations Squadron (Washington ANG)
 102nd Network Warfare Squadron (Rhode Island ANG)
 112th Cyberspace Operations Squadron (Pennsylvania ANG)
 119th Cyberspace Operations Squadron (Tennessee ANG)
 140th Cyberspace Operations Squadron (New Jersey ANG) 
 166th Network Warfare Squadron (Delaware ANG)
 168th Cyberspace Operations Squadron (Iowa ANG)
 185th Cyberspace Operations Squadron (Virginia ANG)
 224th Cyberspace Operations Squadron (Idaho ANG)
 229th Cyberspace Operations Squadron (Vermont ANG)
 261st Cyberspace Operations Squadron (California ANG)
 272nd Cyberspace Operations Squadron (Michigan ANG) 
 273rd Information Operations Squadron (Texas ANG)
Marines
Marine Corps Forces Cyberspace Command
 Marine Corps Cyberspace Operations Group
 Marine Corps Cyberspace Warfare Group
 Marine Forces Reserve
 Defensive Cybersecurity Operations Company A
 Defensive Cybersecurity Operations Company B
Coast Guard
 U.S. Coast Guard Cyber Command
U.S. Coast Guard Office of Cyberspace Forces
Space Force
 Space Delta 6
 21st Space Operations Squadron
 61st Cyberspace Squadron
 62nd Cyberspace Squadron
 65th Cyberspace Squadron

Uruguay
Defense Informatic Security Incidents Response Team (Equipo de Respuesta a Incidentes de Seguridad Informática de Defensa)

Venezuela
 Joint Cyberdefense Directorate (Dirección Conjunta de Ciberdefensa)
 Cyberdefense Operations Division (División de Operaciones de Ciberdefensa)
 Information Security Management Division (División de Gestión de Seguridad Informática)
 Investigation and Development Division (División de Investigación y Desarrollo)

Vietnam
 Cyber Operations Command (Bộ Tư lệnh Tác chiến không gian mạng)
 1st Brigade (Lữ đoàn 1)
 2nd Brigade (Lữ đoàn 2)
 3rd Brigade (Lữ đoàn 3)
 10th Laboratory (Viện 10)
 Force 47 (Lực Lượng 47)

See also
 List of CBRN warfare forces
 List of paratrooper forces
 List of marines and naval infantry forces
 List of mountain warfare forces

Notes

References

Lists of military units and formations
Lists of organizations
Cyber warfare forces
Military lists
Cyberwarfare